The Crystal Range is a small chain of mountain peaks in the Desolation Wilderness in the U.S. state of California.  It is a subrange of the Sierra Nevada. The highest and most southerly peak is Pyramid Peak at 9985 ft; Mount Agassiz is next north at 9967 ft, with Mount Price (9975 ft) rounding out the southern group of peaks. Tells Peak is the northernmost named peak in the range.

It is southwest of Lake Tahoe and north of U.S. Route 50.  Two main access roads run off of U.S. Route 50, Ice House Road, which is furthest west, and more easterly,  Wright's Lake Road which is a steep road not conducive to trailers or large vehicles. Many access the tallest peak Pyramid Peak from Hwy 50 directly hiking in, to the Desolation Wilderness.

References

External links 
 The Crystal Range seen from east within the Desolation Wilderness looking over Lake Aloha, Pyramid Peak on the left.

Mountains of the Desolation Wilderness
Mountain ranges of Northern California